Posavje District could refer to:

 Posavje District (Independent State of Croatia), a district of the Independent State of Croatia
 Posavje District, Ljubljana, a district of the City Municipality of Ljubljana, central Slovenia